This is a list of the National Register of Historic Places listings in Greene County, Pennsylvania.

This is intended to be a complete list of the properties and districts on National Register of Historic Places in Greene County, Pennsylvania, United States. The locations of National Register properties and districts for which the latitude and longitude coordinates are included below, may be seen in a map.

There are 44 properties and districts listed on the National Register in the county, including one National Historic Landmark.  One property was once listed, but has since been removed.

Current listings

|}

Former listings

|}

See also

 List of National Historic Landmarks in Pennsylvania
 National Register of Historic Places listings in Pennsylvania
 List of Pennsylvania state historical markers in Greene County

References

 
Greene County